Anam Syahrul Fitrianto is an Indonesian footballer who currently plays for Persijap Jepara as a defender, fullback.

References

Indonesian footballers
Living people
1986 births
Association football defenders
Persijap Jepara players
People from Jepara
Sportspeople from Central Java